Tang-e Chowgan-e Sofla (also Romanized as Tang-e Chowgān-e Soflá, and Tang-e Chowgān Soflá; also known as Tang-e Chowgān-e Pā’īn) is a village in Shapur Rural District, in the Central District of Kazerun County, Fars Province, Iran. At the 2006 census, its population was 191, in 41 families.

References 

Populated places in Kazerun County